Laide Bakare is a Nigerian actress. Her film Jejere won the 2012 Best of Nollywood Awards in the Best Constume Design category.

She was nominated for Most Outstanding Actress Indigenous Category at the 4th Africa Movie Academy Awards in 2008 for her role in the film Iranse Aje (2008).

Career 
Her first movie Jejere  was premiered in the UK.

References 

Nigerian film producers
Yoruba actresses
21st-century Nigerian actresses
Living people
Year of birth missing (living people)